Googal (2018) is a Kannada romantic family drama film that revolves around a husband and wife, and the wife's boyfriend. The film takes place in an ancient village named Googal in Raichur district. Directed by V. Nagendra Prasad and produced by V.Nagendra Prasad, N.Sridhar, and L.Ashwathnaryan. It features V. Nagendra Prasad, Shubha Poonja, Shobaraj, Deepak Ganesh, and Amrutha Rao Muni. The film's musical score is by V.Nagendra Prasad.

Cast
V. Nagendra Prasad as Harish
Shubha Poonja as Nandini
Shobaraj as Baddi Babanna
Deepak Ganesh
Amrutha Rao
Muni

References

2018 films
2010s Kannada-language films
Films directed by V. Nagendra Prasad